Formal Wars is an Australian reality television series produced by Matchbox Productions that premiered on the Seven Network on 25 July 2013. In each episode, two high school students hand over control of their school formal to their parents. The series is hosted by Melanie Vallejo.

Format 
The series sees high school students handing over control of their high school formal preparations to their parents. Each week, two high school students receive $2,000 towards the cost of their school formal but their parents are given control and must decide their date, their attire and their transport to the venue.

Series One (2013) 
The first series premiered on the Seven Network on 25 July 2013 at 8:30 pm.

References 

2013 Australian television series debuts
2013 Australian television series endings
2010s Australian reality television series
English-language television shows
Seven Network original programming
Television series by Matchbox Pictures